Jannes Albert "Jan" Bruyn (born 9 October 1948) is a retired Dutch rower. He competed at the 1972 Summer Olympics in the double sculls event, together with Paul Veenemans, and finished in seventh place.

References

1948 births
Living people
Dutch male rowers
Olympic rowers of the Netherlands
Rowers at the 1972 Summer Olympics
Sportspeople from The Hague